Marie Besnier Beauvalot (born July 30, 1980) is a French billionaire heiress. She is a major shareholder of Lactalis.

Early life
Marie Besnier Beauvalot was born in 1980. Her father, Michel Besnier, was the CEO of Lactalis from 1955 to 2000. Her paternal grandfather, André Besnier, founded the Besnier Group (later known as Lactalis) in 1933. She has two brothers: Emmanuel Besnier, who is the CEO of Lactalis, and Jean-Michel Besnier.

Career
Besnier inherited 100% of Lactalis with her brothers in 2000. As of 2018, she is worth an estimated US$5.6 billion.

Personal life
Besnier is married. She resides in Laval, Mayenne, France.

References

1980 births
Living people
People from Laval, Mayenne
French businesspeople
French billionaires
Female billionaires
Marie